Time Bomb is a 1953 British film noir thriller film directed by Ted Tetzlaff and starring Glenn Ford, Anne Vernon and Maurice Denham. It was produced by MGM at the company's Elstree Studios with sets designed by the art director Alfred Junge. In the United States it was released under the title Terror on a Train.

Plot
In Birmingham, Railway Police Constable Charles Baron (John Horsley) is involved in a confrontation with a man believed to be a local vagrant. The man gets away, but he is soon found out to have been a saboteur, who has left a suitcase full of detonators and bomb-making components at the railway yard. Police realize that the man was attempting to sabotage a trainload of sea mines, destined for the Royal Navy Yard at Portsmouth. The train is stopped as soon as possible in case an explosion is imminent, but a residential area is nearby and the police have to evacuate local residents.

The local authorities get in contact with former World War Two Royal Canadian Engineers bomb disposal Major Peter Lyncort (Glenn Ford), who is living in the city with his Parisian French wife Janine (Anne Vernon) and working for Anglo-Canadian Machine Tool Co., Ltd. Lyncort agrees to help, when the city's Railway Police security chief Jim Warrilow (Maurice Denham) visits. Janine Lyncort is not there, as she had walked out on him after their tenth fight in just one week.

Lyncort begins opening the trainload of mines one by one. They are hollow and a small explosive charge hidden inside any one could explode the whole train. The work is slow as well as dangerous, and Warilow joins in as Lyncort's assistant. They find an explosive charge and Lyncort disarms it.

Meanwhile, the police plan to catch the saboteur in Portsmouth, in case he goes there to see the fruits of his labours, like an arsonist who stays at the scene of his crime. Constable Baron drives to the railway station in Portsmouth. He recognizes the suspect (Victor Maddern), who is apprehended; they are flown by Royal Navy helicopter back to Birmingham, and taken to the stopped train. Lyncort tells him the bomb has been disarmed, but the saboteur becomes agitated and reveals that there is a second bomb, and it is due to go off at any moment, killing them all and devastating the neighbourhood. However, it has a chemical fuse, whose timing may be somewhat inaccurate.

Janine, meanwhile, remains unaware of all this. Coming home at 3 am to make up with Lyncort, she finds their home empty and starts making phone calls to all the local hospitals, fearing Lyncort has been involved in an accident. Eventually, Janine finds out where her husband is and arrives just in time to see him find the second bomb.  He throws it away from the train and it explodes harmlessly in mid-air. They walk away, holding each other closely, as the movie ends.

Cast

 Glenn Ford as Major Peter Lyncort 
 Anne Vernon as Janine Lyncort 
 Maurice Denham as Jim Warilow 
 Harcourt Williams as Vicar 
 Victor Maddern as Saboteur 
 Harold Warrender as Sir Evelyn Jordan 
 John Horsley as Constable Charles Baron 
 Campbell Singer as Inspector Brannon 
 Bill Fraser as Constable J. Reed 
 Herbert C. Walton as Old Charlie 
 Martin Wyldeck as Sergeant Collins 
 Arthur Hambling as Train Driver 
 Harry Locke as Train Fireman 
 Frank Atkinson as Guard
 Ernest Butcher as Martindale
 Peter Illing as 	Carlo
 Jack McNaughton as Briggs 
 Robert Rietty as 	Mr. Hancock 
 Amy Dalby as Sarah - Charlie's Wife 
 Jean Anderson as Matron
 Hilda Fenemore as 	Jimmy's Mother 
 Leslie Phillips as Police Sergeant
 Charlotte Mitchell as 	Buffet Waitress 
 Jack May as Pub Patron 
 Ada Reeve as Old Lady 
 Jack MacGowran as Bearded Man in Hostel 
 Keith Pyott as 	Train District Superintendent 
 Edward Evans as Policeman at Station 
 Arthur Mullard as 	Policeman Evacuating Pub
 Laurence Naismith as 	Ambulance Man 
 Russell Waters as 	Ticket Collector 
 Sam Kydd as Ticket Inspector

Reception
According to MGM records the film earned $346,000 in the US and Canada and $400,000 elsewhere, resulting in a loss of $517,000.

In their survey of British B movies, Steve Chibnall and Brian McFarlane describe Time Bomb as "a slickly made suspense thriller with a twist in the tail" that "pointed the direction for British second features over the next decade": "Its compact story, clear narrative trajectory, convincing location work and engaging central performance augmented with entertaining character studies, all provided a template for smaller British production outfits looking to give their films some international appeal."

References

External links
 
 
 

1953 films
1950s thriller films
British black-and-white films
British thriller films
Rail transport films
Metro-Goldwyn-Mayer films
Films set in Birmingham, West Midlands
Films shot at MGM-British Studios
Films scored by John Addison
1950s English-language films
1950s British films